Road 11 is a road in  northwestern Iran. It connects the city of Jolfa near the border with Azerbaijan to the cities of Urmia, Mahabad, Sardasht, Baneh. It ends to the south of Baneh when it finally meets the Iraq border.

References 

Roads in Iran
Road transport in Iran
Road infrastructure in Iran